Fundação Getulio Vargas (Getulio Vargas Foundation, often abbreviated as FGV) is a Brazilian higher education institution and think tank founded on December 20, 1944, with the mission to "stimulate Brazil’s socioeconomic development". Its initial objective was to prepare qualified people to work in public and private administration in Brazil.

FGV is considered by the Think Tanks and Civil Societies Program of the University of Pennsylvania as top think tank in Latin America and best managed worldwide, it ranks seventh best think tank in the world.

FGV offers undergraduate,  MBA, as well as Master's & PhD programs in economics, business administration, public administration, law, social sciences, applied mathematics and international relations. The foundation counts over 90 research centers and produces a large volume of academic research. The subjects cover macro and micro-economics, finance, business, decision-making, law, health, welfare, poverty and unemployment, pollution, and sustainable development. FGV also maintains research programs in the fields of history, social sciences, education, justice, citizenship, and politics. FGV executes projects at the request of the public sector as well, private enterprise and international agencies such as the World Bank and the Inter-American Development Bank (IDB).  Examples include assistance for the successful Rio de Janeiro bids for the 2007 Pan American Games and the 2016 Summer Olympics.

FGV's main office is based in Rio de Janeiro, and is also present in São Paulo and Brasília. In addition, it offers educational programs in over 100 cities in Brazil, through a network of affiliate partner institutions, with Executive Education and MBA programs in several areas of knowledge.

FGV Schools 
FGV operates in many areas of knowledge, such as education, research, technical consulting, editing and publishing.

Schools of Administration
Brazilian School of Public and Business Administration (FGV EBAPE)
São Paulo School of Business Administration (FGV EAESP)
School of Public Policy and Government (FGV EPPG)

Schools of Law
São Paulo Law School (FGV Direito SP)
Rio de Janeiro Law School (FGV Direito Rio)

Schools of Economics
São Paulo School of Economics (FGV EESP)
Brazilian School of Economics and Finance (FGV EPGE)

Schools of Social Sciences
School of Social Sciences (FGV CPDOC)
School of International Relations (FGV RI)

School of Applied Mathematics
School of Applied Mathematics (FGV EMAp)

Institute for Educational Development
 Executive Education
 FGV Online
 FGV In Company

Services, Indexes and Publications
 FGV Press
 FGV Projetos
Brazilian Institute of Economics

Centers and Divisions
 Business Cooperation Committee
 Chamber FGV of Mediation & Arbitration
 Center for the Development of Mathematics and Science
 Center for Global Economics
 Center for Regulation and Infrastructure Studies
 Department of Public Policy Analysis
 FGV Energy - Center for Energy Studies
 FGV Social - Center for Social Policy
 Growth & Development - Center for Growth and Economic Development Studies
 International Affairs Division
 International Intelligence Unit

General Administration
 Applied Research and Knowledge Network
 Communications and Marketing Division
 Controllership Superintendent's Office
 Division of Operations
 FGV Library System
 Human Resources Division
 Internal Control Division
 Provost Office
 Treasury

Accreditation
The São Paulo School of Business Administration is the only Brazilian school to receive Triple accreditation from all three major international accreditation institutions (and one of only 82 schools worldwide):
AACSB
AMBA
EQUIS (EFMD)

International Partnerships
FGV has over 200 academic cooperation agreements with renowned institutions all over the world, which include research, joint projects and exchange of students and professors.

See also

Brazil University Rankings
Universities and Higher Education in Brazil

References

External links
 Fundação Getúlio Vargas' main website
 FGV Annual Report
 FGV Research
 FGV Periodicals

Institute for Educational Development
 FGV Executive Education 
 FGV In Company
 FGV Online 

Schools in Rio de Janeiro
 CPDOC - School of Social Sciences 
 Direito Rio - Rio de Janeiro Law School 
 EBAPE - Brazilian School of Public and Business Administration
 EMAp - School of Applied Mathematics 
 EPGE - EPGE Brazilian School of Economics and Finance

Schools in São Paulo
 Direito SP - Sao Paulo Law School
 EAESP - Sao Paulo School of Business Administration
 EESP - Sao Paulo School of Economics 
 RI - School of International Relations

Services, Indexes and Publications
 FGV Press 
 FGV Projetos
 Brazilian Institute of Economics

Centers and Divisions
 DAPP - Department of Public Policy Analysis
 FGV Energy - Center for Energy Studies
 FGV Social - Center for Social Policy
 Growth & Development - Center for Growth and Economic Development Studies
 DINT - International Affairs Division
 IIU - International Intelligence Unit

General Administration
 FGV Library System (SB) 

 
1944 establishments in Brazil
Educational institutions established in 1944
Private universities and colleges in Brazil
Universities and colleges in São Paulo